The Eparchy of San Nicola di Ruski Krstur is a Greek Catholic Church of Croatia and Serbia ecclesiastical territory or eparchy of the Catholic Church in Serbia. It was founded in 2003 as apostolic exarchate with territory in Serbia and Montenegro, and was reduced to the territory of Serbia in 2013. In 2018, it was elevated to an eparchy by Pope Francis. Since 2003, it is headed by bishop Đura Džudžar.

The Eparchy of Ruski Krstur is one of two eparchies for the Greek Catholic Church of Croatia and Serbia, together with the Eparchy of Križevci in Croatia. The Eparchy of Ruski Krstur is exempt directly to the Holy See. The Eparchy of Križevci is a suffragan of the Latin Church Archdiocese of Zagreb.

The Eparchy of Ruski Krstur mostly serves a group of Rusyn Greek Catholics in the region of Vojvodina.

Apostolic Exarchate of Serbia and Montenegro (2003–2013) 

Until 2001, the Greek Catholic Eparchy of Križevci had full jurisdiction over all Eastern Catholics of the Byzantine Rite throughout the entire territory of the former Yugoslavia, including all of its successor states: Croatia, Slovenia, Bosnia-Herzegovina, Serbia, Montenegro and North Macedonia.

After the formation of independent successor states from what had been Yugoslavia, the process of administrative reorganization was initiated. In 2001, the separate Byzantine Catholic Apostolic Exarchate of Macedonia was formed for Eastern Catholics of the Byzantine Rite in neighboring North Macedonia. It was fully separated from the Eparchy of Križevci and directly subjected to the Holy See.

In 2003, a new apostolic exarchate was created for Byzantine Catholics in Serbia and Montenegro, the Apostolic Exarchate of Serbia and Montenegro. Its first and only exarch was Eparch Đura Džudžar, who was appointed on August 28 (2003), with residence in Ruski Krstur. This exarchate remained in association with the Eparchy of Križevci.

In 2004, the Apostolic Exarchate for Serbia and Montenegro had 26 parishes with 22,934 faithful and 18 priests, and in 2009 it had 21 parishes with 22,369 faithful and 18 priests.

Apostolic Exarchate of Serbia (2013–2018) 
On 19 January 2013, all Greek Catholics in Montenegro were entrusted to the local Latin bishops, so the jurisdiction of the Apostolic Exarchate of Serbia and Montenegro was reduced to just Serbia. Bishop Đura Džudžar remained in his post as exarch. The Apostolic Exarchate of Serbia is still associated with the Greek Catholic Eparchy of Križevci as part of the Greek Catholic Church of Croatia and Serbia.

The Apostolic Exarchate of Serbia practices liturgy in the Slavonic form of Byzantine Rite and uses the Old Church Slavonic language and the Cyrillic alphabet. Adherents of the Eastern Catholic Byzantine Rite in Serbia are mainly Rusyns, . In 2016, the Apostolic Exarchate for Serbia had 21 parishes with 21,845 faithful and 21 priests.

Greek Catholic Eparchy of Ruski Krstur (since 2018) 
On December 6, 2018, the Apostolic Exarchate of Serbia was elevated by Pope Francis to the rank of Eparchy and Đura Džudžar was appointed the first eparchial bishop.

Gallery

See also
 Catholic Church in Serbia
 Religion in Vojvodina
 Catholic Church in Kosovo
 Byzantine Catholic Church in Montenegro

References

External links

 Eparchy of Križevci 
 Apostolic Exarchate of Macedonia (2001-2018) on Catholic Hierarchy
 Apostolic Exarchate of Serbia (2013-2018) on Catholic Hierarchy
 Rusyns in Serbia
 Catholic Information

Greek Catholic Church of Croatia and Serbia
Eastern Catholicism in Serbia
Eastern Catholicism in Montenegro
Eastern Catholic dioceses in Europe
Christian organizations established in 2018
Dioceses established in the 21st century
2018 establishments in Serbia
Serbia
Ruski Krstur
Pannonian Rusyns